The 1980 Nicholls State Colonels football team represented Nicholls State University as an independent during the 1980 NCAA Division I-AA football season. Led by Bill Clements in his seventh and final season as head coach, the Colonels compiled a record of 2–9. Nicholls State played home games at John L. Guidry Stadium in Thibodaux, Louisiana.

Schedule

References

Nicholls State
Nicholls Colonels football seasons
Nicholls State Colonels football